Christine M. Sinicki (born March 28, 1960) is an American Democratic politician and a member of the Wisconsin State Assembly since 1999.  She represents the 20th Assembly district, which comprises the cities of Cudahy and St. Francis, and southern Milwaukee, in southeastern Wisconsin.

Early life and career
Born in Milwaukee, Wisconsin, Sinicki was raised in Milwaukee's Bay View neighborhood and is a graduate of Bay View High School.  After graduation, Sinicki worked as a waitress until becoming manager of a small business in Bay View.  As a mother, she became involved in parent–teacher association meetings and was eventually elected president.

Political career
Her involvement with the PTA, led her to run for a seat on the Milwaukee School Board, where she served until her election to the Assembly.

In 1998, with the retirement of Democratic incumbent Rosemary Potter, Sinicki decided to jump into the race for Wisconsin State Assembly to succeed her.  Sinicki didn't face a Democratic primary opponent, and easily prevailed over her Republican opponent in the general election, taking 60% of the vote.  She is currently serving her 12th term representing this district.

In the Assembly, she currently serves on the committees on Labor and Integrated Employment, on Workforce Development, on Forestry, Parks and Outdoor Recreation, on Veterans and Military Affairs, and on State Affairs.  She was chosen as Democratic caucus secretary for the 2001–2002 session, and as minority caucus sergeant-at-arms for the 2019–2020 session.  She was selected as a Wisconsin delegate to the 2000 Democratic National Convention and was a presidential elector for Al Gore.

Personal life
Sinicki and her husband, Michael, have two adult children. They reside in Bayview.

References

External links
Official government website
 
 Follow the Money - Christine Sinicki
2008 2006 2004 2002 2000 1998 campaign contributions
Campaign 2008 campaign contributions at Wisconsin Democracy Campaign

Democratic Party members of the Wisconsin State Assembly
1960 births
Living people
Politicians from Milwaukee
School board members in Wisconsin
Businesspeople from Milwaukee
Women state legislators in Wisconsin
21st-century American politicians
21st-century American women politicians